James Sinclair, 12th Earl of Caithness (1766–1823) was a Scottish noble, Earl of Caithness and chief of the Clan Sinclair, a Highland Scottish clan.

James Sinclair was born at Barrogill Castle (Castle of Mey) on 31 May 1766. He was the son of Sir John Sinclair of Mey, Baronet who he succeeded in the baronetcy in 1774. He succeeded as 12th earl of Caithness in 1789, as nearest lawful male heir of William Sinclair, 2nd Earl of Caithness. His claim to the peerage was sustained by the House of Lords.

In 1811 he was appointed Deputy Postmaster General of Scotland in place of Francis Gray, 14th Lord Gray. Following his death on 16 July 1823 the post was filled by Sir David Wedderburn, 1st Baronet.

He was lord-lieutenant of the county of Caithness and lieutenant-colonel of the Ross-shire militia.

He married at Thurso Castle on 2 January 1784 Jane, second daughter of Alexander Campbell of Bareldine who was deputy governor of Fort George. They had the following children:

John Sinclair, Lord Berriedale who died in 1802 aged 14.
Alexander Sinclair, 13th Earl of Caithness.
Four other sons and three daughters.

See also

Barony of Roslin
Lord Sinclair
Lord Herdmanston

References

Lord-Lieutenants of Caithness
Earls of Caithness
1823 deaths
Clan Sinclair